Chahak Rural District is in Chahak District of Khatam County, Yazd province, Iran. At the National Census of 2006, its population was 5,374 in 1,309 households, when it was in the Central District. There were 6,025 inhabitants in 1,626 households at the following census of 2011. At the most recent census of 2016, the population of the rural district was 6,057 in 1,758 households. The largest of its 91 villages was Chahak, with 2,947 people. After the census, the rural district was elevated to the status of a district and divided into two rural districts.

References 

Khatam County

Rural Districts of Yazd Province

Populated places in Yazd Province

Populated places in Khatam County